The Etosha Ecological Institute (EEI) is an organization within the Ministry of Environment and Tourism in Namibia that manages all research activities within the Etosha National Park. It was formally opened on 1 April 1974 by Adolf Brinkmann of the South-West Africa Administration.

References